Widowmaker, in comics, may refer to:

 Widowmaker (Marvel Comics), a four issue comic book limited series published by Marvel Comics starring superheroes Black Widow, Hawkeye and Mockingbird
 Widowmaker (character), an assassin from the comic book series Noble Causes
 "Widowmaker", a Marvel Comics storyline written by Andy Diggle appearing in Thunderbolts
 "Widowmaker", a Marvel Comics storyline written by Garth Ennis appearing in Punisher MAX
 Widow Maker, a character from Jonah Hex

References

See also
Widowmaker (disambiguation)